Malayalam Encyclopedia may refer to:
 Britannica Malayalam Encyclopedia, Malayalam translation of the Britannica Concise Encyclopedia
 Sarvavijnanakosam, Malayalam language encyclopedia; known in English as Malayalam Encyclopedia